The 2011 European Mixed Curling Championship was held from September 30 to October 8 at the Tårnby Curling Club in Tårnby, Denmark. In the final, Switzerland, skipped by Thomas Lips, won their first title after a 9–3 defeat of Germany in seven ends. The Czech Republic picked up the bronze medal with a 7–6 win over home team Denmark in nine ends.

Teams

Red Group

Blue Group

Green Group

Round-robin standings
Final round-robin standings

Round-robin results
All draw times are listed in Central European Time (UTC+01).

Red Group

Saturday, October 1
Draw 1
20:00

Sunday, October 2
Draw 3
08:30

Monday, October 3
Draw 5
16:00

Tuesday, October 4
Draw 6
12:00

Draw 7
19:30

Wednesday, October 5
Draw 9
12:00

Draw 10
16:00

Thursday, October 6
Draw 12
08:30

Draw 14
16:00

Friday, October 7
Draw 16
08:30

Draw 18
16:00

Blue Group

Sunday, October 2
Draw 2
08:30

Draw 3
16:00

Monday, October 3
Draw 4
08:30

Tuesday, October 4
Draw 7
19:30

Wednesday, October 5
Draw 8
08:30

Draw 10
16:00

Thursday, October 6
Draw 13
12:00

Draw 15
19:30

Friday, October 7
Draw 16
8:30

Draw 18
16:00

Green Group

Sunday, October 2
Draw 2
08:30

Monday, October 3
Draw 4
14:30

Draw 5
16:00

Tuesday, October 4
Draw 6
12:00

Wednesday, October 5
Draw 9
12:00

Draw 11
19:30

Thursday, October 6
Draw 12
08:30

Draw 14
16:00

Friday, October 7
Draw 17
12:00

Post-Round Robin Challenge
Following the end of the round robin, the top two teams from each group advanced to the quarterfinals. The last two spots were determined with a Post-Round Robin Challenge, where the third-ranked teams in each group participated. All four team members of each team participated in a Draw Shot Challenge (DSC). The two teams with the closest DSCs, the Czech Republic and Finland, advanced to the quarterfinals.

1 Results measured in centimetres (cm).
2 Results marked as "185.4 cm" were outside the house.

Playoffs

Quarterfinals
Friday, October 7, 20:30

Semifinals
Saturday, October 8, 10:00

Bronze medal game
Saturday, October 8, 15:00

Gold medal game
Saturday, October 8, 15:00

References

External links
Home Page
Results Home Page

European Mixed Curling Championship
2011 in curling
2011 in Danish sport
Tårnby Municipality
International curling competitions hosted by Denmark